The Pipestem River is a short river in east-central North Dakota. The river is also referred to as "Pipestem Creek".

It flows briefly from Wells County into reservoir formed by Pipestem Dam north-northwest of Jamestown, North Dakota, and thence into the James River, the confluence being on the southwest side of the city.

Rivers of North Dakota
Bodies of water of Wells County, North Dakota
Bodies of water of Stutsman County, North Dakota

References